Mahmoud el Materi University-UMM is a private Tunisian university located in Tunis, accredited by the State of Tunisia, which specializes in health studies.

It holds the name of doctor Mahmoud El Materi. His daughter, Anissa El Materi Hached, is the founding president of the university.

History 
In 2000, Anissa El Materi Hached established Mahmoud el Materi Institute for nursing (professional education). In 2007, The institute was renamed to Mahmoud el Materi University (UMM). At that time, the university only provided a nursing bachelor program.In 2009, the university started a diversification initiative and launched a physiotherapy bachelor program, then an anesthesiology bachelor program in 2010, midwifery in 2011, nutrition in 2013 and geriatric care in 2015.

In 2015, Mahmoud el Materi University gets as well an habilitation for the athletic coaching professional master program. It became operational in 2017.

Mahmoud el Materi University disclosed on June 5, 2017 its new visual identity. This new visual identity is bilingual, presenting an interlacing between the French and Arabic initial letters of the university, which symbolizes an exchange of cultures and knowledges. The new logo is a blend between pure and modern shapes and a traditional calligraphy presenting a combination between tradition and innovation, which is realized by the university through the introduction of high definition medical simulation in its programs and the launching of a Center for pedagogical support and innovation. Besides, with a logo which does not anymore contain health symbols, Mahmoud el Materi University translates in images its ambition to propose other subjects than heath programs.

Degrees 
 Bachelor in anesthesiology 
 Bachelor in geriatric care
 Bachelor in midwifery
 Bachelor in physiotherapy
 Bachelor in human nutrition
 Bachelor in nursing
 Master in athletic coaching

Center for pedagogical support and innovation 
Mahmoud el Materi University launched in 2017 the first Center for pedagogical support and innovation in Tunisia.

The Center for pedagogical support and innovation of Mahmoud el Materi University aims to contribute to the improvement of the university academic education quality, either theorical and during the internships, and the design of innovative pedagogical frameworks and tools. The center trains, advises and support the teachers, the trainers and the internships supervisors of the university.

External links
 

Universities and colleges in Tunisia
Buildings and structures in Tunis